Theniet El Had may refer to:

 Théniet El Had, a commune of Tissemsilt province, Algeria
 Théniet El Had National Park